Harry and Max (alternative title Harry + Max), is a 2004 American drama film directed by Christopher Münch and starring Bryce Johnson and Cole Williams.

Plot
The film centers around teen idol brothers, Harry (Johnson), and Max (Williams). Harry is at the end of his career while Max is just starting his. Harry is heterosexual, whereas Max is gay and, despite his youth, has come to terms with his sexuality.

During a camping trip, matters get further complicated by a partial resumption of an incestuous affair between the brothers. The fallout from this further muddles both their lives, as they attempt to understand their feelings for each other and to protect each other in a world in which everybody, including their own mother, seems to want to take advantage of them.

Cast
 Bryce Johnson as Harry
 Cole Williams as Max
 Rain Phoenix as Nikki
 Katherine Ellis as Brandi
 Roni Deitz as Roxanne
 Tom Gilroy as Josiah
 Michelle Phillips as Mother
 Justin Zachary as Jordan
 Max Piscioneri as Max, Aged 9
 Mark L. Young as Harry, Aged 15

Awards
Harry and Max was nominated for the Grand Jury Prize at the 2004 Sundance Film Festival.

References

External links
 
 

2004 films
American teen drama films
2004 drama films
American LGBT-related films
Incest in film
LGBT-related drama films
2004 LGBT-related films
2000s English-language films
2000s American films